Akil Amen-Diop Watts (born February 4, 2000) is an American soccer player who plays as a right-back for St. Louis City in Major League Soccer.

Career

Club
Watts started his career playing for Portland Timbers Academy. In 2018, after his performances at the 2017 FIFA U-17 World Cup, he signed a professional contract with Spanish team RCD Mallorca. On August 6, 2019, he signed with Louisville City FC at the USL Championship. On August 30, 2019, Watts made his professional debut when he started and played 56 minutes of the 1–1 draw against Indy Eleven at the USL Championship. Following the 2021 season, Louisville opted to decline their contract option on Watts.

International
Watts represented the United States at the 2017 CONCACAF U-17 Championship and the 2017 FIFA U-17 World Cup. At the World Cup, he played three, of the five matches, the Americans played at the World Cup, including the "Round of 16" 5–0 win against Paraguay (when he started and played the entire match) and the "Quarter-finals" 4–1 defeat against England (when he started and played 86 minutes).

References

External links
 
 
 Player's Profile at Louisville City FC

American soccer players
2000 births
Living people
Association football defenders
Sportspeople from Fort Wayne, Indiana
Soccer players from Indiana
RCD Mallorca B players
United States men's youth international soccer players
USL Championship players
Louisville City FC players
MLS Next Pro players
St. Louis City SC 2 players